, literally "Love's Fragment", is a song by the J-pop duo Every Little Thing, released as their seventeenth single on October 18, 2000.

Track listing
  (Words - Kaori Mochida / music - Kunio Tago)
  (Steppin' Hard Enough mix)
  (Cat Walk mix)
  (instrumental)

Chart positions

External links
 "Ai no Kakera" information at Avex Network.
 "Ai no Kakera" information at Oricon.

2000 singles
Every Little Thing (band) songs
Songs written by Kaori Mochida
2000 songs
Avex Trax singles